Jasem Yaqoub Sultan Al-Besara (born 25 October 1953 in Kuwait City) is a former Kuwaiti professional footballer. He represented the Kuwait national team at both the 1980 Summer Olympics and 1982 FIFA World Cup.

Club career statistics

References

1953 births
Living people
Kuwaiti footballers
Kuwait international footballers
Footballers at the 1980 Summer Olympics
Olympic footballers of Kuwait
1976 AFC Asian Cup players
1980 AFC Asian Cup players
1982 FIFA World Cup players
Qadsia SC players
AFC Asian Cup-winning players
Sportspeople from Kuwait City
Association football forwards
Kuwait Premier League players